"I'll Be Home for Christmas" is a Christmas song written by the lyricist Kim Gannon and composer Walter Kent and recorded in 1943 by Bing Crosby, who scored a top ten hit with the song. Originally written to honor soldiers overseas who longed to be home at Christmas time, "I'll Be Home for Christmas" has since gone on to become a Christmas standard.

Theme
The song is sung from the point of view of a soldier stationed overseas during World War II, writing a letter to his family. In the message, he tells his family he will be coming home and to prepare the holiday for him, and requests snow, mistletoe, and presents under the tree. The song ends on a melancholy note, with the soldier saying, "I'll be home for Christmas, if only in my dreams". The flip side of the original recording (Decca 18570B) was "Danny Boy."

Writing and copyright
The song was written by the lyricist Kim Gannon and composer Walter Kent. Songwriter and later producer and manager for The Platters, Buck Ram, who said he previously wrote a poem and song with the same title, was credited as a co-writer of the song following a lawsuit brought by Ram's publisher, Mills Music. Bing Crosby's original 1943 release of the song on Decca Records listed only Walter Kent and Kim Gannon as the songwriters on the record label. Later pressings added the name of Buck Ram to the songwriting credit.

Bing Crosby recording
On October 1, 1943, Crosby recorded the song under the title "I'll Be Home for Christmas (If Only in My Dreams)", with the John Scott Trotter Orchestra for Decca Records;  it was released as a 78 rpm single, Decca 18570A, Matrix #L3203, and reissued in 1946 as Decca 23779. Within a month of release, the song charted for 11 weeks, with a peak at number three. The next year, the song reached number 16 on the charts.

The U.S. War Department also released Bing Crosby's performance of "I'll Be Home for Christmas" from the December 7, 1944, Kraft Music Hall broadcast with the Henderson Choir, J.S.T., on V-Disc, as U.S. Army V-Disc No. 441-B and U.S. Navy V-Disc No. 221B, Matrix #VP1253-D5TC206. The song from the broadcast has appeared in many Bing Crosby compilations.

In the midst of World War II, the song touched the hearts of Americans, both soldiers and civilians, and it earned Crosby his fifth gold record. "I'll Be Home for Christmas" became the most requested song at Christmas U.S.O. shows. The GI magazine Yank said Crosby "accomplished more for military morale than anyone else of that era".

Despite the song's popularity with Americans at the front and at home, in the UK the BBC banned the song from broadcast, as the Corporation's management felt the lyrics might lower morale among British troops.

Seventy-seven years after its original release, Bing Crosby's "I'll Be Home for Christmas" debuted on the Billboard Hot 100 chart (at number 50 on the chart dated January 2, 2021).

Charts

Notable history and cover versions 
Elvis Presley recorded the song in September 1957, and was featured on the LP Elvis' Christmas Album.

Singer Johnny Mathis also covered the song on his Merry Christmas album in 1958, which was the #2 Christmas album of 1963 and 1964 as there were no Christmas album rankings prior to 1963. In December 1965, astronauts Frank Borman and Jim Lovell, while on Gemini 7, requested "I'll Be Home for Christmas" be played for them by the NASA ground crew. Since the incarnation of the Billboard Hot 100 chart in 1958, cover versions by Cuban-American singer Camila Cabello and American singers Kelly Clarkson and Josh Groban are the only versions of the song to enter the chart.

Kelly Clarkson version

Michael Bublé version

Brian McKnight version

Pentatonix version

Seth MacFarlane version

Josh Groban version

Reba McEntire version

Rascal Flatts version

Sara Evans version

Elvis Presley and Carrie Underwood version

Camila Cabello version

Certifications and sales

Michael Bublé

References

Sources 
 
  Call number: ML128 .N3 E9.
  Call number: ML156.4 .P6 W495 1994.

American Christmas songs
Songs about soldiers
Songs about the military
1943 songs
1943 singles
Bing Crosby songs
Songs of World War II
Songs with lyrics by Kim Gannon
Songs written by Buck Ram
Decca Records singles
Songs with music by Walter Kent
Songs banned by the BBC